Giovanni Morelli (25 February 1816  – 28 February 1891) was an Italian art critic and political figure.  As an art historian, he developed the "Morellian" technique of scholarship, identifying the characteristic "hands" of painters through scrutiny of diagnostic minor details that revealed artists' scarcely conscious shorthand and conventions for portraying, for example, ears. He was born in Verona  and died in Milan.

Early life and training 
Morelli studied medicine in Switzerland and Germany, where he taught anatomy at the University of Munich. During this time he also studied Goethe's morphology, Lavater's physiognomy, F. Schelling's natural philosophy and befriended Bettina von Arnim. With his return to Italy he acted as a conduit for intellectual life of the North.

Art historian

The Morellian method 
The Morellian method is based on clues offered by trifling details rather than identities of composition and subject matter or other broad treatments that are more likely to be seized upon by students, copyists and imitators. Instead, as Carlo Ginzburg analysed the Morellian method, the art historian operates in the manner of a detective, "each discovering, from clues unnoticed by others, the author in one case of a crime, in the other of a painting". These unconscious traces — in the shorthand for rendering the folds of an ear in secondary figures of a composition, for example — are unlikely to be imitated and, once deciphered, serve as fingerprints do at the scene of the crime. The identity of the artist is expressed most reliably in the details that are least attended to. The Morellian method has its nearest roots in Morelli's own discipline of medicine, with its identification of disease through numerous symptoms, each of which may be apparently trivial in itself.  Morelli developed his method studying the works of Botticelli, and then applied it to attribute works to Botticelli's pupil, Filippino Lippi.  His fully developed technique was published as Die Werke Italienischer Meister, ("The work of the Italian masters") in 1880; it appeared under the anagrammatic pseudonym "Ivan Lermolieff".  Morelli's "great antagonist, the art historian Wilhelm von Bode, even spoke of the spread of an epidemic of “Lermolieffmania”, after the mysterious Russian scholar “Ivan Lermolieff”, the pseudonym under which Morelli published his writings, in the German translation by an equally non-existent Johannes Schwarze, a resident of the imaginary Gorlaw, which is to say Gorle, near Bergamo."

Morelli's connoisseurship was developed to a high degree by Bernard Berenson, who met Morelli in 1890. The first generation of Morellian scholars also included  Gustavo Frizzoni, Jean Paul Richter, Adolfo Venturi  and Constance Jocelyn Ffoulkes.

Legacy as art historian 
Morellian scholarship penetrated the English field from 1893, with the translation of his master work. The Morellian technique of connoisseurship was extended to the study of Attic vase-painters by J. D. Beazley and by Michael Roaf to the study of the Persepolis reliefs, with results that further confirmed its validity. Morellian recognition of "handling" in undocumented fifteenth and sixteenth-century sculpture, in the hands of scholars like John Pope-Hennessy, have resulted in a broad corpus of securely attributed work. At the same time, modern examination of Classical Greek sculpture, in the wake of pioneering reassessments by Brunilde Sismondo Ridgway, has also turned away from  attributions based on broad aspects of subject and style that are reflected in copies and later Roman classicising pastiche.

The complementary field of document-supported art history traces its origins to the somewhat earlier work of Joseph Archer Crowe and Giovanni Battista Cavalcaselle.

The Morellian method of finding essence and hidden meaning in details had also a much wider cultural influence. There are references to his work in the works of Sigmund Freud. Like Morelli, Freud had a medical background.

The Morellian method was re-examined by R. Wollheim, "Giovanni Morelli and the origins of scientific connoisseurship", On Art and the Mind: Essays and Lectures, 1973.

Collector and donor 
Morelli began collecting art in the mid-1850s, "follow[ing] his own tastes and scholarly interests, but without a particular plan" - his earliest acquisitions were the Portrait of a Young Man by Ambrogio de Predis and the Saint John the Evangelist and Saint Martha by Bergognone.  Morelli's collection expanded "mainly in the 1860s and early ’70s [...] partly thanks to the help of his cousin Giovanni Melli, who purchased several paintings for Morelli, which then came back to him by inheritance."  Morelli acquired works "from Florence, Siena, and Umbria [...] from ancient Tuscan families, and paintings from Emilia and Ferrara came from the sale of the prestigious Costabili Collection" - including "real gems" such as "The Young Smoker by Molenaer, Botticelli’s The Stories of Virginia, both of which were purchased at the Monte di Pietà auction in Rome, and Pisanello’s Portrait of Leonello d’Este, bought in London."

Morelli's collection was completed in about 1874.  It decorated the rooms of his residence in Via Pontaccio 14 in Milan, until Morelli’s death in 1891.  Morelli bequeathed his collection to the Accademia Carrara at Bergamo (where it arrived in 1892), "which thus acquired the collection of one of the greatest art historians of the nineteenth century. In 1892, Gustavo Frizzoni, a friend and faithful follower of Morelli and his method, arranged the 117 paintings and 3 sculptures in two galleries of the museum named after the senator, which later appeared in a printed catalogue."

Political career 
Morelli was a "firm believer in the Unification of Italy [...] [taking] part in the insurrectionary uprisings in Milan in 1848, and in 1860 he was appointed senator for his patriotic merits."

References

Sources
Born-on-This-Day
 

 
 

1816 births
1891 deaths
Italian art critics
Italian art historians
Italian Waldensians
19th-century journalists
Male journalists
19th-century male writers